The 1850 New Jersey gubernatorial election was held on November 5, 1850. Democratic nominee George Franklin Fort defeated Whig nominee John Runk with 53.84% of the vote.

General election

Candidates
George Franklin Fort, State Senator for Monmouth County (Democratic)
John Runk, former U.S. Representative from Kingwood (Whig)

Results

References

1850
Gubernatorial
New Jersey
November 1850 events